Webster Gradney, Jr. (born September 6, 1985) who performs under the mononym Webbie, is an American rapper from Baton Rouge, Louisiana. He's been signed to the independent Trill Entertainment label since 2003. In 2005 he came into the hip hop scene with "Gimme That" featuring Bun B. His songs "Bad Bitch" and "Swerve" were featured on Gangsta Musik, his 2003 group album with Lil Boosie, and in the 2005 movie Hustle & Flow. Webbie's second album, Savage Life 2, was released in early 2008 with the hit single "Independent" featuring Lil Boosie and Lil Phat.

Early life 
Webbie was born in Baton Rouge, Louisiana. His mother died when he was nine years old so his parental care was split between his father and grandmother. Ever since he was five years old, he had been writing rhymes, and throughout his childhood he had become an avid fan of hardcore rap artists including Southern hip hop performers Master P, Eightball & MJG, the Geto Boys, UGK Along With DjTrillReed (Second Cousin).
.

Music career 
Webbie first appeared on Lil Boosie's album For My Thugz on the track "Gotta Get It" in 2001. He and Lil Boosie released Ghetto Stories in 2003 and Gangsta Musik in 2004. As Webbie's solo track "Give Me That" featuring Bun B was frequently featured in mixtapes, as a label Trill Entertainment was growing in popularity & was signed for a distribution deal at Asylum Records along with (Webbie).
After he was signed there, his major-label debut Savage Life was released in 2005, debuting at number eight on the US Billboard 200 chart.

Trill began a deal to sign Webbie to the subsidiary label Atlantic Records & was successful. Singles from his next album, Savage Life 2, include "Independent" featuring Boosie and Lil Phat. As of 2020, it is Webbie's most successful song to date, peaking at number nine on the Billboard Hot 100 and reaching the top of the Rap Songs chart.
Webbie released his third studio album Savage Life 3 on November 15, 2011, under Trill Ent. The first single from the album was "What's Happenin'". The album has currently sold over 50,000 copies.

Webbie's fourth album Savage Life 4 is the fourth in the Savage Life album series. The first single from the album "What I Do" was released on April 16, 2013. The album was released on November 19, 2013.

Acting career 
He has made an independent biographical movie, Ghetto Stories in October 2010, with Lil Boosie, based on their lives and lyrical themes. He also appeared in the music film "Video Girl" which featured actress Meagan Good.

Controversy 
On the October 14, 2011, episode of BET's 106 & Park, Webbie was banned from further appearances on the countdown show. Webbie appeared that day on the show as a guest judge for Freestyle Friday. The reason behind his ban was tied to allegations that he made sexually inappropriate comments to the show's hostess, Rocsi.

On September 13, 2012, Webbie was arrested in Baton Rouge on suspicion of robbery and battery. He was accused of kicking and pushing a woman down the stairs before stealing $340 from her purse.

Discography 

Studio albums
 Savage Life (2005)
 Savage Life 2 (2008)
 Savage Life 3 (2011)
 Savage Life 4 (2013)
 Savage Life 5 (2016)
 Savage Life 6 (2020)
Collaboration albums
2003: Ghetto Stories (with Lil Boosie)
2003: Gangsta Musik (with Lil Boosie)
2007: Trill Entertainment Presents: Survival of the Fittest (with Foxx, Lil Boosie and Trill Fam)
2010: Trill Entertainment Presents: All or Nothing (with Foxx, Lil Boosie and Trill Fam)
2016: Trill Entertainment Presents: Trill Fam – Respect Is a Must (with Trill Fam)

Filmography 
Films
 Gangsta Musik (2005)
 On The Grind (2006)
 Ghetto Stories: The Movie (2010)
 Video Girl (2011)
 I Got the Hook up 2 (2019)

References

External links 
Official Twitter
Trill Ent.
Profile at Rolling Stone

1985 births
Living people
African-American male rappers
Southern hip hop musicians
Gangsta rappers
Musicians from Baton Rouge, Louisiana
21st-century American rappers
21st-century American male musicians
21st-century African-American musicians
20th-century African-American people